Srisailamgudem Devasthanam is a village in Nandyal district in the Indian state of Andhra Pradesh.

Demographics 
 India census, Srisailamgudem Devasthanam had a population of 6,854. Males constitute 52% of the population and females 48%. Srisailamgudem Devasthanam has an average literacy rate of 54%, lower than the national average of 59.5%: male literacy is 65%, and female literacy is 42%. In Srisailamgudem Devasthanam, 14% of the population is under 6 years of age.

References 

Villages in Kurnool district